Unveil the Mystery is the second compilation album by the Canadian progressive rock band Mystery. While At the Dawn of a New Millennium features lead vocals by Gary Savoie, Unveil The Mystery features lead vocals by Benoît David. The cover art for the album was originally going to be the cover art for Beneath the Veil of Winter's Face.

Track listing

Release information
 CD - Unicorn Digital - UNCR-5095 - 2013

References

2013 compilation albums
Mystery (band) compilation albums